The Niagara Purple Eagles were unable to attempt to qualify for the NCAA Tournament for the second time in school history. Goaltender Jenni Bauer was named All-CHA First Team for the second consecutive season.

Recruiting
 Niagara women’s hockey head coach Chris MacKenzie announced the 2010-11 recruiting class. The second-year head coach brings in eight newcomers (five forwards, one defensemen and two goalies).

Offseason
 August 12: Former Niagara player Ashley Riggs was selected second by the Burlington Barracudas in the 2010 CWHL Draft.

Regular season
 Nov. 4 and 6: Daniela Dal Colle was the only Purple Eagle to score goals in two different games during the week. She registered Niagara’s first goal in a 4-2 loss to St. Lawrence. In Niagara’s upset win over No. 4 Mercyhurst, Dal Colle scored Niagara’s first goal of the game.
 Jenni Bauer made a total of 52 saves as the Purple Eagles swept Wayne State. It is Niagara’s first road sweep of the Warriors since February 2005. On January 14, Bauer made 27 saves as she earned her first career shutout. The following day, Bauer made 17 straight saves, and shut out the Warriors in the second and third period. Bauer finished the weekend with a 0.50 goals against average and .981 save percentage.
 January 22: The Purple Eagles beat the Orange, 3-1, in front of 770 fans at Dwyer Arena. Niagara extended its six-game unbeaten streak with its first-ever sweep of Syracuse. Said streak is the longest since the 2002 Frozen Four campaign and the Purple Eagles’ four-game win streak is their longest since they won four straight from Feb. 26-March 9, 2006. In addition, the game was Niagara’s annual Pink the Rink game, to raise breast health awareness. For the second straight season, the Purple Eagles wore pink jerseys and for the second straight season Niagara defeated a conference rival, 3-1 (Robert Morris was defeated in 2010). Jenni Bauer made 28 saves as she picked up her second shutout win in three games with a 1-0 victory on the 21st. The following day, Bauer made 14 saves and allowed one goal. Bauer has allowed two goals in the last 239 minutes (four games). In the series, Bauer had a 0.50 goals against average, .977 save percentage and 42 saves. Kaleigh Chippy had a career-high weekend versus Syracuse. She was involved in all three goals as the Purple Eagles won by a 3-2 mark. In the third period, she scored a power-play goal with 4:41 remaining in the third period.

Standings

Schedule

Conference record

Postseason

Awards and honors
 Jenni Bauer, College Hockey America Goaltender of the Week (Week of January 17, 2011)
 Jenni Bauer, CHA Defensive Player of the Week (Week of January 24, 2011)
 Ashley Cockell, CHA Defensive Player of the Week (Week of February 21)

Postseason
 Jenni Bauer, All-CHA First Team
 Erica Owczarczak, All-CHA Second Team
 Kristen Richards, CHA All-Rookie Team

References

N
N
Niagara Purple Eagles women's ice hockey seasons
Niagara Purple Eagles men's basketball
Niagara Purple Eagles men's basketball